The 1983 Kentucky gubernatorial election was held on November 8, 1983. Democratic nominee Martha Layne Collins defeated Republican nominee Jim Bunning with 54.50% of the vote, becoming the first female governor of Kentucky.

Primary elections
Primary elections were held on May 24, 1983.

Democratic primary

Candidates
Martha Layne Collins, incumbent Lieutenant Governor
Harvey I. Sloane, Mayor of Louisville
W. Grady Stumbo, former Secretary of the Kentucky Cabinet for Human Resources
Ray Adkins
Doris Shuja Binion
Fifi Rockefeller

Results

Republican primary

Candidates
Jim Bunning, State Senator 
Lester H. Burns Jr., attorney
Don Wiggins Jr.
Elizabeth Bette Wickham
Thurman Jerome Hamlin
Ben Auxier Jr.

Results

General election

Candidates
Major party candidates
Martha Layne Collins, Democratic
Jim Bunning, Republican 

Other candidates
Nicholas McCubbin, Independent

Results

References

1983
Kentucky
Governor